Prostanthera athertoniana is a species of flowering plant in the family Lamiaceae and is endemic to a restricted area of Queensland.  It is a small, densely-foliaged shrub with strongly aromatic, elliptical, oblong or egg-shaped leaves and hairy, purplish-mauve flowers arranged singly in upper leaf axils.

Description

Taxonomy
Prostanthera athertoniana was first formally described in 2015 by Barry Conn and Trevor Wilson in the journal Telopea from specimens collected on Kahlpahlim Rock in what is now known as Dinden National Park.

Distribution and habitat
This mintbush is only known from the type location on Kahlpahlim Rock where it grows in windswept heath.

Conservation status
Prostanthera athertoniana is classified as of "least concern" under the Queensland Government Nature Conservation Act 1992.

References

athertoniana
Flora of Queensland
Lamiales of Australia
Taxa named by Barry John Conn
Plants described in 2015
Endemic flora of Queensland